Carlos Gabriel Moreira de Oliveira (born 3 April 1999), commonly known as Carlos Gabriel or Hulk, is a Brazilian footballer who plays as a left-back for Cianorte. He is nicknamed Hulk due to his physical resemblance to the international player.

Career statistics

Club

Notes

References

1999 births
Footballers from Brasília
Living people
Brazilian footballers
Association football defenders
Esporte Clube Bahia players
Fluminense FC players
Clube Atlético Mineiro players
Paraná Clube players
FC Porto B players
Cianorte Futebol Clube players
Campeonato Brasileiro Série A players
Campeonato Paranaense players
Liga Portugal 2 players
Brazilian expatriate footballers
Brazilian expatriate sportspeople in Portugal
Expatriate footballers in Portugal